John Charles Winter (19 June 1923 – 21 February 2012)  was a cathedral organist, who served at Truro Cathedral.

Background
John Charles Winter was born on 19 June 1923 in Bungay, Suffolk. He was educated at Bungay Grammar School

Career
Assistant organist:
 Truro Cathedral ca.1950 - 1971

Organist of:
 Truro Cathedral 1971 - 1988 (later Organist Emeritus)
 Church of King Charles the Martyr, Falmouth 2001 - 2007

References

English classical organists
British male organists
Cathedral organists
1923 births
People from Bungay
2012 deaths
People educated at Bungay Grammar School
20th-century classical musicians
20th-century British male musicians
Male classical organists